Papillary urothelial neoplasm of low malignant potential (PUNLMP) is an exophytic (outward growing), (microscopically) nipple-shaped (or papillary) pre-malignant growth of the lining of the upper genitourinary tract (the urothelium), which includes the renal pelvis, ureters, urinary bladder and part of the urethra.

PUNLMP is pronounced pun-lump, like the words pun and lump.

As their name suggests, PUNLMPs are neoplasms, i.e. clonal cellular proliferations, that are thought to have a low probability of developing into urothelial cancer, i.e. a malignancy such as bladder cancer.

Signs and symptoms
PUNLMPs can lead to blood in the urine (hematuria) or may be asymptomatic.

Diagnosis

PUNLMPs are exophytic lesions that appear friable to the naked eye and when imaged during cystoscopy.
They are definitively diagnosed after removal by microscopic examination by pathologists.

Histologically, they have a papillary architecture with slender fibro vascular cores and rare basal mitoses.  The papillae rarely fuse and uncommonly branch.  Cytologically, they have uniform nuclear enlargement.

They cannot be reliably differentiated from low grade papillary urothelial carcinomas using cytology, and their diagnosis (vis-a-vis low grade papillary urothelial carcinoma) has a poor inter-rater reliability.

Pathologic grading and staging tumors are:
graded by the degree of cellular atypia (G1->G3), and
staged:
 papilloma
 papillary tumor of low malignant potential (PTLMP)
 papillary urothelial carcinomas low grade
 papillary urothelial carcinomas high grade.

Differential diagnosis
 Papilloma.
 Low grade papillary urothelial carcinoma.

Treatment
PUNLMPs are treated like non-invasive low grade papillary urothelial carcinomas, excision and regular follow-up cystoscopies.

There is a rare occurrence of a pelvic recurrence of a low-grade superficial TCC after cystectomy. Delayed presentation with recurrent low-grade urothelial carcinoma is an unusual entity and potential mechanism of traumatic implantation should be considered. Characteristically low-grade tumors are resistant to systemic chemotherapy and curative-intent surgical resection of the tumor should be considered.

References

Urological neoplasia